The 2007 edition of the Handball International Championships was the VII European Championship (in French Championnat d’Europe des Jeux de Paume), organized by the 
International Ball game Confederation, and was held at the Belgian cities of Nivelles and Buizingen during September 21 and 23.

The playing countries were Belgium, France, Italy, Netherlands and the Valencian Pilota Squad representing Spain.

Each own has its local variety: Belgian Balle pelote, Dutch Frisian handball, French Longue paume, Italian Pallone, and Valencian pilota.

Belgian players are professionals of their sport. There are also professional Valencian pilotaris, but in Escala i corda and Raspall, not in Llargues.

The varieties of the Handball sports derived from the old Jeu de paume that were played were International fronton, International game and Llargues.

The matches of International International fronton (1-walled) were played at the Turncentrum Start 65 of Buizingen, and the matches of International game and Llargues were played at the Parc de la Dodaine of Nivelles. Access to the matches was free.

International fronton 
The International fronton was played by teams of 2 players (with 1 replace), players were allowed to strike the ball with the bare hand or using a glove without reinforce. Matches consisted on 2 sets (11 points each one), with a third set in case of a tie (7 points).

Fronton Classification

International game 
Due to time limitations, International game matches were played only one of the teams attained 6 games. In the classification, the winner team receives 3 points in case of victory 6-2 or better, otherwise (6-3 or worse) winner gets 2 points and loser 1 point.

International game Classification

Llargues 
Under the name of Llargues the original Belgian handball, the Balle pelote was played. Since its differences are mynimal the adaptation requires a slight elongation of the courtfield and a softer ball.

Due to time limitations, Llargues matches were played only one of the teams attained 6 games. In the classification, the winner team receives 3 points in case of victory 6-2 or better, otherwise (6-3 or worse) winner gets 2 points and loser 1 point.

Llargues Classification

Champions

Best player 
During the award ceremony the CIJB chose Dutch Johan van der Meulen as the Best player.

Absolute winner 
The Absolute winner is the team who scored more points in the over-all classification according to this formula applied to the different varieties:
 Winner: 4 points.
 Runner-up: 3 "
 3rd place: 2 "
 4th place: 1 "
 5th place: 0 points.

Since the Belgian and the Valencian Pilota Squad scored the same number of points (9), the next factor is the number of victories in all the varieties, but they both won the same number of matches (9 again), then another factor applied is the number of points acquired in every variety which resulted in a third draw (24 points)

So, the CIJB, in a meeting previous to the award ceremony decided the Valencian Pilota Squad to be the Absolute Champion.

Squads

Belgian squad 
 Picture

Coach:
 Jean-Luc Plaitin

Physician:
 Claude Wery

Referees:
 Daniel Cordier
 Eddy Peeters
 Johny Van Eesbeek

Players:
 Samuel Brassart
 Philippe Demil
 Ludovic Destrain
 David De Vits
 Benjamin Dochier
 Steve Dugauquier
 Guillaume Dumoulin
 Damien Famelart
 Geoffrey Frebutte
 Laurent Gobron
 Franck Van Den Bulcke
 Geert Vinck

Dutch squad 
Coach:
 Pieter Tienstra

Physician:
 Piet van Assen

Referees:
 Peter de Bruin
 Sipke Hiemstra

Players:
 Johannes Boersma
 Marten Feenstra
 Robert Grovenstein
 Marten Hiemstra
 Pier Piersma
 Robert Rinia
 Johan van der Meulen, Best player
 Michel van der Veen
 Folkert van der Wei

French squad 
Coach:
 Eric Midavaine

Referees:
 Jean-Pierre Charpentier
 Laurent Tollenaere

Players:
 Bruno Blanquet
 Andy Couteau
 Michaël Dhont
 Conrad Dubois
 Grégory Fontaine
 Laurent Joissains
 Nicolas Picry
 Loïc Potrich
 Florian Toubeaux

Italian squad 
Coach:
 Sergio Corino

Physicians:
 Roberto Campini
 Sergio Giunta

Referees:
 Massimo Ardenti
 Roberto Ravinale

Players:
 Lorenzo Bolla
 Gianluca Busca
 Andrea Corino
 Oscar Giribaldi
 Paolo Neri
 Marco Ramazzotti
 Enrico Rinaldi
 Alessandro Simondi
 Marco Vero

Valencian squad 
 Picture

Coach:
 Pasqual Sanchis Moscardó, Pigat II

Physician:
 Jaume Martí Martí

Psychologists:
 Rocío Gómez Gómez
 Rafael Díaz Cortinas

Referees:
 Conrado Ferrando Borruel
 José María Cortell Chesa

Players:
 Álvaro of Tibi
 David of Petrer
 Ferdi of Godelleta
 Héctor of Meliana
 Jan of Murla
 Màlia I of La Vall de Laguar
 Mario of El Campello
 Martínez of El Campello
 Nacho of Beniparrell
 Pasqual II of La Pobla de Vallbona
 Santi of Finestrat

All of them, except Pasqual II, are amateur players.

Also, the main amount of them come from the Llargues competitions, except of Pasqual II from the Valencian fronto, and Ferdi, Héctor and Nacho from the Galotxa.

6 of the 11 players were debutantes, and 5 of them younger than 25 years old.

References

External links 
  Official webpage
  Competition schedule
  Tagarinet's weblog supporting the Valencian Squad at Belgium
 Blog hosted at the FPV's webpage

Handball in Belgium
Valencian pilota competitions
Handball
2007 in handball
Nivelles